Sultanpur is a Gram panchayat in Karimnagar district in the southern state of Telangana, India. The village is located on the way between Karimnagar and Peddapalli; equal distance from both. Sultanpur is a village in Eligedu mandal.

Sultanpur serves as the postal head for few neighboring villages. Sultanpur has an upper primary school, Zilla Parishad High School.

Agriculture 

Sultanpur produces paddy, maize, ground-nut and more commercial crops. Though every land in the village have bore-wells to water the land, most of the crops are watered with the aid of canal from Sriram Sagar Project.

Transportation 

Mostly one needs to have personal vehicle or they can take autos.

References 

Karimnagar district
Villages in Karimnagar district